Outland is a jazz studio album by Per Jørgensen, Audun Kleive and Jon Balke as the Norwegian trio JøKleBa. This album was released in the label ECM Records in October 2014.

Composition
On this album, the track titles make reference to the works of Sylvia Plath, Laura Restrepo, Sadegh Hedayat, Guy de Maupassant and Ken Kesey.

Reception
John Fordham in his review for The Guardian says that "Jokleba’s music is probably best suited to free-improv listeners, but its meticulous detailing and musicality do have an eerie seductiveness that reaches way outside that loop."

Track listing
ECM Records – ECM 2413.

Personnel
Per Jørgensen – trumpet, vocals, kalimba, flute
Audun Kleive – electronics, drums, percussion
Jon Balke – electronics, piano

References

ECM Records albums
2014 albums
Albums produced by Manfred Eicher